is a light novel publishing imprint affiliated with the Japanese publishing company Fujimi Shobo, a brand company of Kadokawa Corporation. It was established in 1988 and is aimed at young adult male audience. Many light novels published under this imprint are serialized in Fujimi Shobo's Dragon Magazine.

Published titles

!–9

A

B

C

D

E

F

G

H

I

J

K

L

M

N

O

P

Q

R

S

T

U

V

W

Y

References

External links
 

 
Book publishing company imprints
1988 establishments in Japan